Wells Crosby Root (March 21, 1900 – March 9, 1993) was an American screenwriter and lecturer. In the mid-1930s he was involved with the Screen Writers Guild and in the 1950s the University of Southern California asked him to teach Film and Television Writing Technique, where he worked during the next twenty years.

Filmography

Films

Television

References

External links

1900 births
1993 deaths
American film directors
American male screenwriters
Screenwriters from New York (state)
University of Southern California faculty
Writers from Buffalo, New York
20th-century American male writers
20th-century American screenwriters
Yale Bulldogs men's ice hockey players